Sulfoacetaldehyde dehydrogenase (acylating) (SauS) is an enzyme with systematic name 2-sulfoacetaldehyde:NADP+ oxidoreductase (CoA-acetylating). This enzyme catalyses the following chemical reaction

 2-sulfoacetaldehyde + CoA + NADP+  sulfoacetyl-CoA + NADPH + H+

The enzyme is involved in degradation of sulfoacetate.

References

External links 
 

EC 1.2.1